Aetheolaena is a genus of flowering plants in the aster family, Asteraceae.

Species include:
 Aetheolaena caldasensis
 Aetheolaena cuencana
 Aetheolaena decipiens
 Aetheolaena heterophylla
 Aetheolaena hypoleuca
 Aetheolaena involucrata
 Aetheolaena ledifolia
 Aetheolaena lingulata
 Aetheolaena mochensis
 Aetheolaena mojandensis
 Aetheolaena otophora
 Aetheolaena patens
 Aetheolaena pichinchensis
 Aetheolaena rosana
 Aetheolaena subinvolucrata

References

 
Asteraceae genera
Taxonomy articles created by Polbot